Orquesta Reciclando is the eighth studio album recorded by Spanish rock group Jarabe de Palo released on May 15, 2009. The album won the Latin Grammy Award for Best Engineered Album and was nominated for Best Pop Album by a Duo or Group with Vocals.

Track listing 

2009 albums
Jarabe de Palo albums